Veronika Domjan (born 3 September 1996) is a Slovenian athlete specialising in the discus throw. She won the silver medal at the 2015 European Junior Championships.

Her personal best in the event is 60.11 metres set in Amsterdam in 2016. This is the current national record.

International competitions

References

1996 births
Living people
Slovenian female discus throwers
Athletes (track and field) at the 2018 Mediterranean Games
Competitors at the 2019 Summer Universiade
Mediterranean Games competitors for Slovenia